Susan Pembrey  (1942 – 2013) was a British nurse best known for her contributions to the development of nursing practice and to patient-centred hospital care.

Early life and education 
Pembrey was born in Sussex to a medical family, with a mother who conducted health visits and provided nursing and midwifery services, and a father who was a doctor. From 1961 to 1964, she trained at the Nightingale School of Nursing at St Thomas' Hospital, and followed this with a diploma in social administration from the London School of Economics.

Career 
Pembrey began her career in the research unit of the General Nursing Council. In the early 1979s, she became a ward sister at St Thomas'.

Pembrey was a member of the Briggs committee.

Pembrey researched the role of the ward sister and their contribution for a Ph.D. with the University of Edinburgh. Her thesis, The Ward Sister – Key to Nursing: A Study of the Organisation of Individualised Nursing, was published by the Royal College of Nursing in 1980.

In the late 1970s, Pembrey began work on district clinical practice development with the Oxfordshire health authority.

In 1989, Pembrey founded the Institute of Nursing in Oxford in collaboration with the RCN, based at the Radcliffe Infirmary.

Awards and honours 
Pembrey was made a Fellow of the Royal College of Nursing in 1979. In 1985, she joined the Commission of Nursing Education.

She was awarded the OBE for services to nursing in 1990.

Death and legacy 
The Sue Pembrey Chair at Queen Margaret University Edinburgh was named in her honour and is held by Professor Jan Dewing.

The Sue Pembrey Award was created to support clinical leaders and person-centred cultures in nursing. It was awarded from 2016.

During the 70th anniversary celebrations of the NHS, Pembrey was noted as one of the 70 nurses who most influenced the NHS from 1948 to 2018.

Pembrey's archive is held by the Royal College of Nursing Archives. They also hold an oral history interview with Pembrey.

References 

1942 births
2013 deaths
British nurses